Sándor is a Hungarian given name and surname. It is the Hungarian form of Alexander.

It may refer to:

People

Given name
 Sándor Apponyi (1844–1925) was a Hungarian diplomat, bibliophile, bibliographer and great book collector
Sándor Boldogfai Farkas (1907–1970),  was a Hungarian nobleman, a Hungarian sculptor, medalist
Sándor Bródy (footballer) (1884–1944), Jewish-Hungarian soccer player
Sándor Bródy (writer) (1863–1924)
Sándor Csányi (banker) (born 1953), CEO of OTP Bank Group
Sándor Csányi (actor) (born 1975), Hungarian actor
Sandor Earl (born 1989), New Zealand born rugby league player
Sándor Erdős (born 1947), Hungarian Olympic champion épée fencer
Sándor Fábry (born 1953), Hungarian comedian, talk show host, and writer
Vitéz Sándor Farkas de Boldogfa (1880–1946) was a Hungarian nobleman, colonel, captain of the Order of Vitéz of the county of Zala, knight of the Order of the Austrian Iron Crown
Sándor Fazekas (born 1963), Hungarian jurist and politician
Sándor Ferenczi (1873–1933), Hungarian psychoanalyst
Sándor Garbai (1879–1947), Hungarian socialist politician
Sándor Gáspár (politician) (1917–2002), Hungarian communist politician and trade unionist
Sándor Gáspár (born 1956), Hungarian actor
Sándor Gellér (1925–1996), Hungarian Olympic champion soccer goalkeeper
Sándor Gombos (1895–1968), Hungarian Olympic champion saber fencer
Sándor Károlyi (1668–1743), Hungarian aristocrat, statesman and Imperial Feldmarschall
Sándor Keresztes (1919–2013), Hungarian diplomat and jurist
Sándor Kocsis (1929–1979), Hungarian footballer
Sándor Kónya (1923–2002), Hungarian operatic tenor
Shaolin Sándor Liu (born 1995), Hungarian Olympic champion short track speed skater
Sandor Martin (born 1993), Spanish boxer
Sándor Márai (1900–1989), Hungarian poet, novelist, and journalist
Sándor Mogyorós (1911–1969), Romanian Communist politician and activist of Hungarian ethnicity (also known as Alexandru Moghioroș)
Sándor Noszály (born 1972), Hungarian tennis player
Sándor Petőfi (1823–1849), Hungarian poet and liberal revolutionary
Sándor Puhl (1955–2021), Hungarian football referee
Sándor Radó (1899–1981), Hungarian cartographer and a Soviet military intelligence agent 
Sándor Simonyi-Semadam (1864–1946), Hungarian politician
Sándor Sörös (born 1951), Hungarian actor
Sándor Tarics (1913–2016), Hungarian water polo player who won a gold medal in the 1936 Summer Olympics
Sándor Végh (1912–1997), Hungarian/French violinist
Sándor Weöres (1913–1989), Hungarian poet and author

Surname
György Sándor (1912–2005), Hungarian pianist
Károly Sándor (1928–2014), Hungarian footballer
Count Vincent Sándor de Szlavnicza, landowner, Hungarian aristocrat who commissioned the building of Sándor Palace, Budapest, building started around 1803
Count Móric Sándor de Szlavnicza (1805–1878), landowner, once owner of the Sándor Palace in Budapest.

Fictional characters
See Sandor (disambiguation)#Fictional characters

Hungarian-language surnames
Hungarian masculine given names